The 1921–22 season was Stoke's 22nd season in the Football League and the fourth in the Second Division.

After almost being relegated to the third tier last season Stoke improved dramatically and finished in 2nd position gaining promotion to the First Division. Key to Stoke's success was the early season signing of the Broad brothers Tommy and Jimmy with the later scoring 27 goals.

Season review

League
After the disappointments of last season, there was another conscious effort to strengthen the squad for the 1921–22 season, and a wealthy director John Slater proved to be the most ambitious as he spent a lot of his own money to bring to the club the Broad brothers, Tommy and Jimmy.  Jimmy was an out-and-out centre forward who came in after having scored 37 goals in 48 matches for Millwall.  Tommy on the other hand was a pacey right winger who signed from Manchester City. The idea of developing young talent was also coming to the fore, with the appointment of Tom Brittleton as player-coach, which was met with approval from the club's supporters.

The season turned out to be one of the best the club had experienced up to that time and promotion was gained to the top-flight, Stoke finishing runners-up to Nottingham Forest. Eleven home draws probably cost Stoke top spot but nevertheless their form throughout the season was very good and the team was well supported by the fans with an average attendance of 15,000. Jimmy Broad was top scorer with 25 league goals and he also became the first Stoke player to score four goals in a Football League match, achieving this feat in a 5–1 home win over Crystal Palace in early December. Stoke also achieved an unbeaten league run of 15 matches from 27 December to 8 April.

FA Cup
The Cup also provided Stoke with some success as they beat local rivals Port Vale 4–2 in an epic cup tie in Burslem.  Arthur Watkin scored a hat-trick in front of 14,471 tie at The Old Recreation Ground. Stoke then saw off Northampton Town 3–0 in a replay before 43,689 fans turned out to see Stoke take on Aston Villa in the third round. The match ended goalless and in the replay Villa ran away with it and scored four without reply.

Final league table

Results
Stoke's score comes first

Legend

Football League Second Division

FA Cup

Squad statistics

References

Stoke City F.C. seasons
Stoke